Hobapromea is a monotypic moth genus in the subfamily Arctiinae described by Watson in 1980. Its single species, Hobapromea cleta, was first described by Turner in 1940. It is found in Queensland, Australia.

References

Lithosiini
Monotypic moth genera
Moths of Australia